Fission Wall is a granite cliff,  high, on the north face of Mount Griffith, Hays Mountains, in the Queen Maud Mountains of Antarctica. The feature was climbed on November 16, 1987, by a United States Antarctic Research Program – Arizona State University geological party led by Edmund Stump. The name derives from granite samples collected on the wall at  spacing for dating by the fission-track method.

References 

Cliffs of the Ross Dependency
Amundsen Coast